Richland-Plummer Creek Covered Bridge, also known as County Bridge #86, is a historic covered bridge located in Taylor Township, Greene County, Indiana.  It was built in 1883, and is a Burr Arch Truss structure measuring 102 feet long, 14 feet wide, and 16 feet tall.  The single span bridge has walls clad in board and batten siding with Italianate style design elements.

It was listed on the National Register of Historic Places in 1993.

References

Covered bridges on the National Register of Historic Places in Indiana
Italianate architecture in Indiana
Bridges completed in 1883
Transportation buildings and structures in Greene County, Indiana
National Register of Historic Places in Greene County, Indiana
Road bridges on the National Register of Historic Places in Indiana
Wooden bridges in Indiana
Burr Truss bridges in the United States